The level-index (LI) representation of numbers, and its algorithms for arithmetic operations, were introduced by Charles Clenshaw and Frank Olver in 1984.

The symmetric form of the LI system and its arithmetic operations were presented by Clenshaw and Peter Turner in 1987.

Michael Anuta, Daniel Lozier, Nicolas Schabanel and Turner developed the algorithm for symmetric level-index (SLI) arithmetic, and a parallel implementation of it. There has been extensive work on developing the SLI arithmetic algorithms and extending them to complex and vector arithmetic operations.

Definition
The idea of the level-index system is to represent a non-negative real number  as
 
For example,
 
so its LI image is
 

Mathematically, this is equivalent to taking the reciprocal (multiplicative inverse) of a small magnitude number, and then finding the SLI image for the reciprocal. Using one bit for the reciprocal sign enables the representation of extremely small numbers.

A sign bit may also be used to allow negative numbers. Mathematically, this is equivalent to taking the inverse (additive inverse) of a negative number, and then finding the SLI image for the inverse. Using one bit for the sign enables the representation of negative numbers.

The mapping function is called the generalized logarithm function.  It is defined as
 
and it maps  onto itself monotonically and so it is invertible on this interval. The inverse, the generalized exponential function, is defined by
 

 

The generalized logarithm function is closely related to the iterated logarithm used in computer science analysis of algorithms.

Formally, we can define the SLI representation for an arbitrary real  (not 0 or 1) as
 
 
whereas for  = 0 or 1, we have:
 
 

For example,
 
and its SLI representation is

See also
 Tetration
 Floating point (FP)
 Tapered floating point (TFP)
 Logarithmic number system (LNS)
 Level (logarithmic quantity)

References

Further reading
 
 
  
  . Also reprinted in:

External links
 sli-c-library (hosted by Google Code), "C++ Implementation of Symmetric Level-Index Arithmetic".

Computer arithmetic